Tetragonoderus rhombophorus is a species of beetle in the family Carabidae. It was described by Schmidt-Goebel in 1846.

References

rhombophorus
Beetles described in 1846